12" Masters – The Essential Mixes (commonly referred to as simply Essential Mixes) is a remix album by American singer and songwriter Justin Timberlake. It was released on September 17, 2010, by Sony Music Entertainment and Jive Records. The album contains remixes of tracks from his first two studio albums: Justified (2002) and FutureSex/LoveSounds (2006).

Composition
12" Masters – The Essential Mixes features 11 "club-friendly reworkings" of Timberlake's singles spanning from 2002 to 2007.

Critical reception
According to Jon O'Brien of AllMusic, 12" Masters – The Essential Mixes will "at the very least bump up his sparse back catalog", suggesting that it will satisfy his "army of fans" that are desperate for new music. He noted that remix albums are "notoriously hard to pull off", as they have the tendency to "smother the original" in "generic pounding beats" and "repetitive synths", which leads to the concept's downfall. O'Brien wrote that: "Luckily, Essential Mixes, one of a series of a 2010 releases that has also tackled the works of Kylie Minogue, Usher, and Avril Lavigne, features a consistently stellar lineup of hotshot and well-respected producers who are a cut above the copy-and-paste merchants usually wheeled out for these types of affairs." He concluded that, while the album "doesn't always do justice to the consistently brilliant source material", it is an "intriguing stopgap" that shows Timberlake's sound is "capable of translating to the Ibiza dance scene as well as the U.S. R&B clubs".

Track listing

Notes
 signifies a remixer

Release history

References

2010 remix albums
Justin Timberlake albums
Jive Records remix albums
Sony Music remix albums
Albums produced by Justin Timberlake
Albums produced by Timbaland
Albums produced by the Neptunes
Albums produced by Danja (record producer)